The Premier League is the top tier of professional football in England.  The league was formed in 1992 as a replacement for the original Football League First Division. To date, there have been 275 managers in charge of the 50 clubs which have played in the Premier League.

Arsène Wenger holds the record for most games managed in the Premier League with 828, all with Arsenal, which he managed between 1996 and 2018. The most successful manager in the Premier League is Alex Ferguson, who won 13 titles – more than three times as many as any other manager – with Manchester United between 1993 and 2013. Sam Allardyce has managed the most teams in the Premier League, having taken charge of eight different clubs: Bolton Wanderers, Newcastle United, Blackburn Rovers, West Ham United, Sunderland, Crystal Palace, Everton and West Bromwich Albion.

Many of the managers listed below served as caretaker (temporary) managers in the period between a managerial departure and appointment. Several of these, however, went on to secure a permanent managerial post.

Managers

The list of managers includes everyone who has managed clubs while they were in the Premier League, whether in a permanent or temporary role. Caretaker managers are listed only when they managed the team for at least one match in that period.

The dates of appointment and departure may fall outside the club's period in the Premier League, for example, Ron Atkinson was appointed as Aston Villa manager in 1991 (before the Premier League was formed in 1992) and remained in his position through the Premier League's establishment. Similarly, Wolverhampton Wanderers' first spell in the Premier League lasted for only one season (2003–04) but manager Dave Jones remained in his position until November 2004.

By club

By nationality

Most games managed in the Premier League

Current Premier League managers and their current clubs are shown in bold.

By club
Current Premier League managers who hold the record for the club are shown in bold.

Premier League title-winning managers

See also
 List of current Premier League and English Football League managers

Notes

References
General
 
 

Specific

External links
 Managers at the official Premier League website

Premier League managers
Lists of Premier League managers